Rewind: The Unreleased Recordings is a compilation (studio) album by JJ Cale. It was released in October 2007. This album contains a number of unreleased tracks recorded between 1971 and 1993 (most of them were cut with a band between 1973 and 1982).

The song "Out of Style" was previously released on the CD reissue of 5, where it was listed as the song it replaced, "Katy Kool Lady".

Track listing

 "Guess I Lose" (JJ Cale) - 2:51
 "Waymore's Blues" (Waylon Jennings) - 2:39 (recorded in 1971)
 * Acoustic Guitar – Christine Lakeland
 * Guitar, Vocals – J.J. Cale
 Musician [All Other] – Unknown Artist

 "Rollin'" (Randy Newman) - 2:55
 * Acoustic Guitar, Vocals – Christine Lakeland
 * Engineer – Lou Bradley, Rick Horton
 * Engineer [Assistant] – Freeman Ramsey 
 * Guitar, Vocals – J.J. Cale
 * Musician [All Other] – Unknown Artist
 * Piano – Toni Migliori*

 "Golden Ring" (Eric Clapton) - 3:05
 * Acoustic Guitar – Christine Lakeland, Johnny Christopher
 * Bass – Tommy Cogbill
 * Drums – Kenny Buttrey
 * Electric Guitar – Steve Gibson
 * Engineer – Ron "Snake" Reynolds*
 * Guitar, Vocals – J.J. Cale
 * Musician [All Other] – Unknown Artist
 * Organ [Hammond B3] – Bobby Emmons
 * Piano – David Briggs (2)
 * Synthesizer – Mike Lawler

 "My Cricket" (Leon Russell) - 2:34
 * Acoustic Guitar – Johnny Christopher
 * Backing Vocals – Christine Lakeland, Marilyn Davis
 * Bass – Tommy Cogbill
 * Drums – Kenny Buttrey
 * Electric Guitar – Steve Gibson
 * Engineer – Ron "Snake" Reynolds*
 * Engineer [Background Vocals] – Chad Hailey
 * Guitar, Vocals – J.J. Cale
 * Organ [Hammond B3] – Bobby Emmons
 * Piano – David Briggs (2)
 * Synthesizer – Mike Lawler

 "Since You Said Goodbye" (JJ Cale) - 2:46 (recorded in 1973)
 * Bass – Tim Drummond
 * Drums – Karl Himmel, Jr*
 * Electric Guitar, Vocals – J.J. Cale
 * Engineer – David McKinley
 * Mixed By [Mix Engineer] – Rick Horton
 * Musician [All Other] – Unknown Artist
 * Slide Guitar [Electric Slide "wah" Guitar] – Mac Gayden

 "Seven Day Woman" (Christine Lakeland) - 2:20
 * Bass – Tim Drummond
 * Drums – Jim Keltner
 * Engineer – Paul Brown
 * Guitar – Richard Thompson
 * Guitar, Vocals – Christine Lakeland, J.J. Cale
 * Organ [Hammond B3] – Spooner Oldham
 * Percussion – Jim Karstein*
 * Piano – Glen D. Hardin*

 "Bluebird" (JJ Cale) - 1:26
 "My Baby and Me" (JJ Cale) - 2:21
 "Lawdy Mama" (JJ Cale) - 2:56 (recorded in 1982)
 "Blue Sunday" (Bill Boatman) - 3:14
 "Out of Style" (JJ Cale) - 2:24
 "Ooh La La" (JJ Cale & Christine Lakeland) - 3:28 (recorded in 1980)
 "All Mama's Children" (JJ Cale) - 2:08

References

2007 albums
J. J. Cale albums
Albums produced by Audie Ashworth